The Slatina  (also: Izvorin) is a right tributary of the river Apa Mare in Romania. It discharges into the Apa Mare in Bărăteaz.

References

Rivers of Romania
Rivers of Arad County
Rivers of Timiș County